Draper Hill (1935 – May 13, 2009) was an American cartoonist and writer.

He was educated at Harvard University and from 1958 until 1964 he worked as a reporter and cartoonist for The Patriot Ledger. He was also the editorial cartoonist for the Memphis Commercial Appeal (1971 -1976) and the Detroit News.

Works
Cartoon and Caricature from Hogarth to Hoffnung (1962).
Mr. Gillray: The Caricaturist, A Biography (1965).
Fashionable Contrasts: Caricatures by James Gillray (1966).
The Satirical Etchings of James Gillray (1976).
(with John Adler), Doomed by Cartoon: How Cartoonist Thomas Nast and the New York Times Brought Down Boss Tweed and His Ring of Thieves (2008).

Notes

1935 births
2009 deaths
American cartoonists
Harvard University alumni